The Sarvodaya Shramadana Movement is a self-governance movement in Sri Lanka, which provides comprehensive development and conflict resolution programs to villages. It is also the largest indigenous organization working on reconstruction from the tsunami caused by the 2004 Indian Ocean earthquake. Founded in 1958 by A. T. Ariyaratne when he took “forty high school students and twelve teachers from Nalanda College Colombo on “an educational experiment” to an outcaste village, Kathaluwa, and helped the villagers fix it up.

As of 2006, Sarvodaya staff people and programs are active in some 15,000 (of 38,000) villages in Sri Lanka. The organization estimates that 11 million citizens are individual beneficiaries of one of its programs. The group distributes funds from a financial reserve bank of 1.6 billion rupees.

The Sarvodaya movement belongs to the Global Ecovillage Network.

Etymology
The movement is based on Buddhist and Gandhian principles. Coined by Mohandas Gandhi, the terms  sarvodaya  ('welfare for all'), and swaraj (self-governance). The word  shramadana  means 'gift of labour'. Collectively, the name 'Sarvodaya Shramadana' means 'welfare for all through our shared labour'.

History
In 1958, the neglected village of Rodiya, inhabited by social outcasts and beggars, received help in the form of renovating houses, digging wells and latrines, and establishing community gardens; educational programs and self-employment help were also launched. The organizer was D. A. Abeysekera, an employee of the Sri Lankan Department of Rural Development, who while searching for solutions for this kind of community coined the term  Shramadana , meaning 'gift of labour', to describe the type of help expected from volunteers. The village of Kathaluwa was to be the first beneficiary of this joint work.

Ahangamage Tudor Ariyaratne, then a young teacher at Nalanda College in Colombo, led a group of teachers and students who participated in what he called an "educational experiment." The success of the "experiment", repeated in other villages, and developing independently from the Department of Rural Development, led to the creation of the largest development-promoting organization in Sri Lanka -  The Sarvodaya Shramadana Movement .

Ten basic needs
Activists led by Ariyaratne tried to meet the real needs of the villagers. To this end, they conducted research in 600 villages, asking residents to list their ten most important needs, in order from most urgent to least important. The survey resulted in a list of the following needs:

 Clean environment
 Adequate supply of water
 Clothing
 Nutritious food
 Shelter
 Health care
 Communication
 Fuel and lighting (energy)
 Access to education
 Cultural and spiritual performance

Program 
The Sarvodaya program begins with an invitation from a village for a discussion of what is needed and how it can be done. It proceeds in stages through creating a village council, building a school and clinic, setting up family programs, creating economic opportunity so that the village economy becomes self-sustaining, starting a village bank, and offering help to other villages. In addition, Sarvodaya sponsors public meditations in which tens and sometimes hundreds of thousands of Buddhists, Hindus, Muslims and Christians meditate together on each other's welfare, using the Buddhist Brahmavihara (sublime attitude) meditations, which are acceptable within all faiths.

Assistance deliberately begins with a change in the attitude of the villagers, and satisfying basic needs is only the third stage. The organization insists on understanding the real needs of a peaceful, sustainable society. A.T. Ariyaratne emphasizes that Sarvodaya is about awakening both individuals and society.

The next five steps are:
 Development of psychological infrastructure,
 Development of social and educational infrastructure,
 Satisfying basic human needs and institutional development,
 Income and job creation and self-sufficiency,
 Sharing with neighbouring villages.

Fusion – Sarvodaya ICT4D Movement is the ICT for development (ICT4D) program. As a response to the emerging digital divide issues of rural Sri Lanka, Sarvodaya started setting up telecentres experimentally in 1997. This has led to the pioneering telecentre program in the country. Village Information Centres (popularly known as VICs) are rural libraries, set up by village youth leaders as 'Zero Cost' village initiatives, which prepare disadvantaged, less educated rural communities for the information age. Out of the 172 VICs initiated since early 2000, there are about 21 VICs graduated to their own forms of telecentres by mid-2008.

In September 2012, Etisalat Sri Lanka, a mobile telephony provider in cooperation with Sarvodaya-Fusion, opened  Etisalat Android Village Hub . The program aims to connect rural communities using Android tablets, which the company distributed to 20 families in selected villages for a period of two weeks and conduct internet training.

Author John P. Clark has argued that the Sarvodaya Shramadana Movement are anarchist in their organisation and goals, noting their inspiration from the philosophical anarchist Mahatma Gandhi.

Tsunami relief
On December 26, 2004, at 9 am, waves flooded the fishing town of Hambantota. The director of one of the institutes for sustainable agriculture in Sarvodaya, Nandana Jayasinghe, was about an hour away from the tragedy, in Thanamalwila next to Udawalawe National Park. After 6 hours he arrived in the town with three 10-ton trucks full of food, water, blankets and other means of survival. In the following days, he organized the next deliveries, and temporary housing for the population and, along with other volunteers in the movement, helped clean up and reorganize the town after the tragedy. The movement participated in helping the region many years after the tsunami. The tsunami destroyed 226 villages belonging to the Sarvodaya movement.

In total, the movement built 1104 houses, 5593 toilets, 2274 wells, 2450 waste composters, 185 water tanks and 85 playgrounds for the victims of the tsunami. The Sarvodaya movement tried to get help from recipients themselves, in order for them to feel responsible and take part in rebuilding their own lives.

See also
Buddhism in Sri Lanka
Nonviolence
Shanthi Sena

Notes

Further reading 
 Ariyaratne, A. T. (1986). Asian values as a basis for Asian development. In D. C. Korten (Ed.), Community management: Asian experience and perspectives (pp. 32–39). West Hartford, CT: Kumarian Press.
 Ariyaratne, A. T. (1987). Beyond development communication: Case study on Sarvodaya, Sri Lanka. In N. Jayaweera & S. Amunugama (Eds.), Rethinking development communication (pp. 239–251). Singapore: Asian Mass Communication Research and Information Center. 
 Ariyaratne, A. T. (1996). Gandhian philosophy and Sarvodaya approach to promote ethnic and racial harmony and economic equality. International Policy Review, 6(1), 122–126. 
 Bond, G. D. (2004). Buddhism at work: Community development, social empowerment and the Sarvodaya movement. Bloomfield, CT: Kumarian Press. 
 Dissanayake, W. (2014). Development and communication in Sri Lanka: A Buddhist approach. In M. K. Asante, Y. Miike, & J. Yin (Eds.), The global intercultural communication reader (2nd ed., pp. 467–479). New York, NY: Routledge.
 Macy, J. (1985). Dharma and development: Religion as resource in the Sarvodaya self-help movement (Rev. ed.). West Hartford, CT: Kumarian Press.

External links 
 http://www.sarvodaya.org
 http://www.sarvodayausa.org
 http://www.sarvodayanepal.org
 http://www.sarvodaya.nl
 http://www.fusion.lk
 https://web.archive.org/web/20160303183259/http://sarvodayajapan.jimdo.com/

Youth organisations based in Sri Lanka
Charities based in Sri Lanka
Self-governance
Environmental organisations based in Sri Lanka